Dawn McGuire (born March 26, 1960) is a Canadian retired women's ice hockey defender who represented Canada at the 1990 and 1992 IIHF Women's World Championships.  She won gold medals at both tournaments.  At the 1990 tournament, she was named the top defenceman and most valuable player.

Statistics

References

1960 births
Living people
Canadian women's ice hockey defencemen
Ice hockey people from Edmonton